Isoxaben (N-[3-(1-ethyl-1-methylpropyl)-1,2-oxazol-5-yl]-2,6-dimethoxybenzamide) is an herbicide from the benzamide and isoxazole family.

It is intended for use in vineyards and tree nut orchards for the preemergence control of broadleaf weeds.

References

External links
 US FDA Integrated Risk Information System toxicity assessment (dead link 8 April 2021)
 

Benzamides
Herbicides
Isoxazoles
Enones